Cghene, or Oghene, is the supreme god of the Urhobo and Isoko people in southern Nigeria. He is believed to have created the world and all peoples. Oghene is beyond human comprehension and is only known by his actions. Because the god is so distant and unknown, he has no temples or priests and no prayers or sacrifices are offered directly to him.

Oghene has a courier named Oyise, who is referred to as uko Oghene or "messenger of Oghene". Through Oyise, Oghene can be invoked in case of calamity or need.

Creator gods
African gods